WSLM-FM (97.9 FM) is a news and sports radio station licensed to serve the community of Salem, Indiana as well as 21 other counties in the Southern Indiana/Louisville, Kentucky market.

WSLM-FM broadcasts from newly renovated digital studios located in Salem, Indiana. It is licensed to Rebecca L. White.

Programming
Currently WSLM-FM is programmed with news and sports format and also holds market-exclusive rights to broadcast Indiana University Sports, Indianapolis Sports, Big Ten Basketball. The station is also the Kentuckiana Home of the Indianapolis Colts as well as all three divisions of NASCAR Racing as well as Indy Car races. White also added the syndicated morning show Rick & Bubba to the station in mid-2013 and continues to broadcast her own long-running morning segment “Coffee Club”.

WSLM-FM is a member of the IHSAA Championship Radio Network and airs coverage of IHSAA Network Football and Boys' and Girls' Basketball. WSLM-FM also carries Indiana Sports talk from Network Indiana.

WSLM-FM is also an affiliate of the Indiana Hoosier Network and Indianapolis Colts Radio Network airing Indiana Football and Basketball games and respective coaches shows and Indianapolis Colts gameday coverage.

WSLM-FM is also the only radio station in the Louisville and Southern Indiana market airing all NASCAR Sprint Cup, Nationwide and Truck Series races as well as selected races from the Indy Racing League.

She first licensed the station in 1992.

References

External links

SLM
Radio stations established in 1962